Archeparchy of Kyiv may refer to :
 Ukrainian Catholic Major Archeparchy of Kyiv-Halych, Major Archeparchy of the Ukrainian Greek Catholic Church
 Ukrainian Catholic Archeparchy of Kyiv, principal archdiocese (archeparchy) of the Ukrainian Catholic Major Archeparchy of Kyiv-Halych

See also 
 Eparchy of Kyiv (disambiguation)
 Patriarchate of Kyiv (disambiguation)
 Roman Catholic Diocese of Kyiv-Zhytomyr
 List of Metropolitans and Patriarchs of Kyiv (enumerating many title variations)
 Bishop of Kyiv (disambiguation)